Jamil Suaiden (born 21 November 1972) is a Brazilian cyclist. He competed in the men's individual road race at the 1996 Summer Olympics.

References

External links
 

1972 births
Living people
Brazilian male cyclists
Brazilian road racing cyclists
Olympic cyclists of Brazil
Cyclists at the 1996 Summer Olympics
Sportspeople from Brasília
Pan American Games medalists in cycling
21st-century Brazilian people
20th-century Brazilian people
Pan American Games bronze medalists for Brazil
Medalists at the 1995 Pan American Games
Cyclists at the 1995 Pan American Games